The 2018 Purdue Boilermakers football team represented Purdue University during the 2018 NCAA Division I FBS football season. The Boilermakers played their home games at Ross–Ade Stadium in West Lafayette, Indiana and competed in the West Division of the Big Ten Conference. They were led by second-year head coach Jeff Brohm.

Purdue began the year with three consecutive losses, each by less than four points, at the hands of Northwestern, Eastern Michigan, and Missouri. Their luck began to turn as they went on a four-game winning streak, which started with a victory over No. 23 Boston College and ended with an upset victory over No. 2 Ohio State, the school's first win over a top-two ranked team since 1984. The Boilermakers also secured a victory over No. 19 Iowa and finished the regular season tied for second in the West Division with a conference record of 5–4. The team was invited to the Music City Bowl, where they lost to Auburn.

The Boilermakers were led on offense by quarterback David Blough, who finished in second in the conference behind Ohio State's Dwayne Haskins in passing yards (3,705), completions (305), and completion percentage (66%). Freshman wide receiver and return specialist Rondale Moore was named first-team All-Big Ten at wide receiver, and was a consensus first-team All-American as a return specialist. He led the Big Ten Conference with 114 receptions, 1,258 receiving yards, and 12 receiving touchdowns.

Previous season
The Boilermakers finished the 2017 season 7–6, 4–5 in Big Ten play to finish in a tie for third place in the West Division. They received a bid to the Foster Farms Bowl, their first bowl game since 2012, where they defeated Arizona, 38–35.

Offseason

2018 NFL Draft

Recruiting

The Boilermakers signed a total of 24 recruits.

Preseason

Award watch lists

Schedule

Source

Roster

Position key

Game summaries

Northwestern

 Sources:

    
    
    
    
    
    
    
    
    

To begin the season, Purdue hosted Northwestern, the first time the two schools opened the season against each over to open the season since 1976.

Purdue lost to Northwestern, 31–27. Northwestern scored 14 points in the first quarter via a 1-yard touchdown run from Jeremy Larkin and a 2-yard touchdown run by John Moten IV. Purdue responded with 14 points in the first quarter via a 32-yard touchdown pass from Elijah Sindelar to Rondale Moore and a 76-yard touchdown run by Moore. Northwestern regained its lead in the second quarter via a 34-yard field goal by Charlie Kuhbander and a one-yard touchdown run by T. J. Green. Purdue responded with a 38-yard Spencer Evans field and the final score of the first half came on a 4-yard run by Larkin, which made the score 31–17 in favor of Northwestern at half-time. Purdue added a 2-yard touchdown run by D. J. Knox in the third quarter. Purdue reduced Northwestern's lead to four points following a 27-yard field goal from Evans in the fourth quarter.

Moore's 313-yard all-purpose yards was the record for most in program history, and first since Otis Armstrong, who had 312 in 1972.

Eastern Michigan

 Sources:

    
    
    
    
    
    
    

Following its opening game against Northwestern, Purdue hosted the Eastern Michigan Eagles. This was the first meeting between the schools since 2012, a game Purdue won in a blowout.

Purdue lost in a close game, 20–19. Purdue scored 6 points in the first quarter via a 29-yard and 34-yard field goals by Spencer Evans. Eastern Michigan added 7 points in the first quarter via a 75-yard touchdown pass from Tyler Weigers to Mathew Sexton. In the second quarter, the teams exchanged scores with a 7-yard touchdown pass from Elijah Sindelar to Markell Jones and a 27-yard field goal by Chad Ryland, which made the score 12–10 in favor of Purdue at half-time. Eastern Michigan regained the lead in the fourth quarter via a nine-yard touchdown run by Breck Turner. Purdue added seven points in the fourth quarter via a 45-yard touchdown run by D. J. Knox. Eastern Michigan finally won the game late in the fourth quarter with a 24-yard field goal by Ryland as time expired.

Missouri

 Sources:

    
    
    
    
    
    
    
    
    
    
    
    
    
    

After playing Eastern Michigan, Purdue hosted the Missouri Tigers.

Missouri defeated Purdue 40–37. Missouri scored three times in the first quarter on a 40-yard Tucker McCann field goal, a 21-yard Drew Lock touchdown pass to Johnathan Johnson and another field goal by McCann from 29-yards. Purdue scored just once in the first quarter on a 12-yard touchdown pass from David Blough to Terry Wright. Purdue scored on three of its four possessions during the second quarter with a 33-yard Spencer Evans field goal, 1-yard touchdown run by Blough and a 3-yard touchdown pass to Brycen Hopkins from Blough. Missouri scored twice during the second, with a 59-yard touchdown pass to Jalen Knox and a 2-yard Albert Okwuegbunam touchdown pass from Lock. Missouri took a 27–24 lead into halftime. Purdue tied the game midway through the third quarter with a 29-yard field goal by Evans, but Missouri scored twice after the field goal with an 8-yard touchdown run by Lock and a 31-yard McCann field goal. Blough then found Rondale Moore from 7-yards out for a Purdue touchdown and a 26-yard field goal by Evans. Missouri took the lead via a 25-yard field goal from McCann as the time expired.

Blough's 572 passing yards were the most since Curtis Painter threw for 546 against Central Michigan in 2007.

Boston College

 Sources:

    
    
    
    
    
    

Following its game against Missouri, Purdue hosted its final non-conference game on the schedule when they hosted the No. 23 Boston College Eagles.

Purdue won in a blowout, 30–13. Purdue and Boston College each scored 7 points in the first quarter via a one-yard touchdown run by D. J. Knox, and Anthony Brown finding Tommy Sweeney on a 15-yard pass. Purdue added 16 points in the second quarter, via two touchdown passes from David Blough to Rondale Moore, the first a 70-yard and the later a nine-yard touchdown pass, and a 21-yard field goal for J. D. Dellinger, which made the score 23–7 in favor of Purdue at half-time. Purdue added 7 points in the third quarter via a 36-yard Blough pass to Terry Wright. Boston College scored a late touchdown in the fourth quarter via a 1-yard touchdown run from E. J. Perry.

Purdue ended streaks of six straight Homecoming losses and 18 straight losses to ranked opponents with its win over No. 23 Boston College. Purdue's last win against a ranked opponent came on October 22, 2011, (a homecoming game) to then-No. 23 Illinois. Purdue's 17-point margin of victory was its largest over a ranked opponent since beating then-No. 5 Michigan State by 24 points (52–28) on October 16, 1999.

at Nebraska

 Sources:

    
    
    
    
    
    
    
    
    
    

After facing Boston College, Purdue traveled to Lincoln, Nebraska to face the Nebraska Cornhuskers.

Purdue defeated Nebraska 42–28. Nebraska scored seven points in the first quarter while Purdue scored ten, via an eighteen-yard touchdown run from Devine Ozigbo and a 42-yard D. J. Knox run and 31-yard Spencer Evans field goal respectively. Purdue extended their lead in the second quarter via a one-yard touchdown run from David Blough and a 25-yard Evans field goal, which made the score 20–7 in favor of Purdue at half-time. In the third quarter, Purdue and Nebraska traded touchdowns in the third quarter. Purdue struck first with a twelve-yard touchdown reception by Brycen Hopkins from Blough. Nebraska answered back with a 21-yard J. D. Spielman from Adrian Martinez. Purdue responded with a 6-yard Knox run followed by a two-point conversion. Nebraska capped the third quarter scoring with another 21-yard Spielman touchdown reception from Martinez. Purdue and Nebraska both scored a fourth quarter touchdown, on a six-yard touchdown by Markell Jones and a 23-yard Ozigbo touchdown run respectively.

Purdue won for the first time in three trips in Lincoln. Nebraska was held scoreless for 36:01 between the first and third quarters as Purdue scored 27 unanswered points Purdue played its most efficient game of the season going six-for-six on its redzone trips.

at Illinois

 Sources:

    
    
    
    
    
    
    
    

Following its road game against Nebraska, Purdue traveled the Illinois Fighting Illini to play for the Purdue Cannon.

Purdue won in a blowout, 46–7. Illinois got on the board first via a five-yard touchdown run from A. J. Bush. Purdue responded with a 3-yard touchdown reception by Isaac Zico from David Blough, and a 7-yard touchdown reception by Blough from Jared Sparks to close out the first quarter scoring. Purdue scored three times in the second quarter on a one-yard Markell Jones touchdown run, a 37-yard field goal from Spencer Evans and a 42-yard Zico reception from Blough to end the half with a 29–7 lead. Purdue extended their lead in the third quarter via a seven-yard touchdown reception by Rondale Moore from Blough. Purdue added 10 more points in the fourth quarter. First with a 32-yard field goal from Evans and a 3-yard touchdown run from Alexander Horvath.

Purdue's defense held Illinois to season-lows of 250 total yards, 181 passing yards and 69 rushing yards. Purdue has won 11 of the last 14 against Illinois, including four straight and eight of the last 10 in Champaign, Illinois. Isaac Zico's 127 receiving yards and two touchdowns were career bests. The 39-point win was Purdue's largest margin of victory since 2012, when it defeated Eastern Kentucky, 48–6. It was Purdue's largest margin of victory over an FBS opponent since 2008, when it crushed Indiana, 62–10. The margin of victory was also Purdue's largest in a Big Ten road game since defeat Indiana in Bloomington, 56–7 in 1997.

Ohio State

 Sources:

    
    
    
    
    
    
    
    
    
    

After its second consecutive away game at Illinois, Purdue returned to West Lafayette to host the No. 2 ranked, undefeated Ohio State Buckeyes.

Purdue shocked Ohio State with a 49–20 victory, during which they never trailed.  David Blough found Isaac Zico with a 13-yard pass reception to give the Boilermakers the only score of the first quarter.  Ohio State had to settle for a 24-yard field goal by Blake Haubeil early in the second quarter.  After a fourth down conversion on a fake field goal, Rondale Moore was able to score on a 9-yard reception from Blough to end the half.  In the third quarter Ohio State drove to the red zone for the second time in the game, only to come away with a 23-yard Haubeil field goal, and Purdue scored on a one-yard run from D.J. Knox.  The teams traded scoring in the fourth quarter, first with Purdue on a 42-yard run from Knox, then Ohio State on a 32-yard reception by Johnnie Dixon from Dwayne Haskins, Purdue with a 40-yard run by Knox, Ohio State with a 34-yard reception by Terry McLaurin from Haskins, and Purdue with a 43-yard reception by Moore from Blough.  Purdue capped the game with a 41-yard interception return by Markus Bailey.

Purdue was able to win despite Haskins setting a school record for passing yardage in a single game (470).  It was the first time they beat a second-ranked team since 1984, when they also defeated the Buckeyes.  Purdue swept the Big Ten Players of the Week awards (Blough for Offensive Player, Bailey for Defensive Player, Joe Schopper for Special Teams, and Moore for Co-Freshman), the first time a team has ever accomplished this feat.

at Michigan State

 Sources:

After facing Ohio State, Purdue traveled to East Lansing, Michigan to face the Michigan State Spartans.
Michigan State defeated Purdue 23–13. Michigan State scored six points in the first quarter, via 43 and 48-yard field goals from Matt Coughlin. Purdue scored 3 points on a 28-yard field goal by Spencer Evans. Purdue tied the game on a 35-yard field goal by Spencer Evans. Michigan State regained the lead via an eleven-yard touchdown pass from Rocky Lombardi to Darrell Stewart Jr., which made the score 13–6 in favor of Michigan State at half-time. In the second half, Michigan State held Purdue to just 7 points while accumulating 10 points. First a field goal by Coughlin from 34-yards in the third quarter. Purdue responded with a 1-yard Terry Wright touchdown reception from David Blough. Michigan State closed out the scoring with a 48-yard touchdown pass from Rocky Lombardi to Jalen Nailor

Blough fell 23 yards shy of becoming the first quarterback in Purdue history to pass for 300 yards in four consecutive games. The loss was Purdue's eighth in a row to Michigan State, continuing a losing streak that started on Nov. 10, 2007.

Iowa

 Sources:

    
    
    
    
    
    
    
    
    
    
    

After losing to Michigan State, Purdue hosted the No. 16 Iowa Hawkeyes in a sellout performance.

Purdue knocked off Iowa, 38–36 after a walk-off, 25-yard field goal by Spencer Evans. Purdue scored the first points in the first quarter by a 36-yard touchdown pass from David Blough to receiver Isaac Zico. Ivory Kelly-Martin evened the score at 7–7 nearly six minutes later; this would be the longest drive of the game. Purdue scored once again via a touchdown run from Markell Jones.

In the second quarter, Miguel Recinos opened off to kick a 34-yard field goal to make the score 14–10, Boilermakers. Purdue and Iowa then traded touchdowns, the former a touchdown pass to Terry Wright from David Blough, the latter coming from Nate Stanley, the Iowa quarterback, with 17 seconds left in the first half. The score was 21–17 at the conclusion of this half.

On the Boilermakers' opening drive of the second half, David Blough found Terry Wright for a stellar 82-yard reception. This was the Boilermakers' only play of the drive. Two and a half minutes later, the Hawkeyes also found the end zone to make the score 28–23. The Hawkeyes, however, made a controversial two-point conversion attempt, which they failed. With 2:26 left in the third quarter, David Blough found Terry Wright in the end zone to make the score 35–23. This was Wright's third touchdown reception of the game.

In the fourth quarter, Iowa mounted a comeback against the Boilermakers. Boosted by two touchdown runs following an interception from David Blough, the Hawkeyes made the score 35–23 after chasing points again. However, the Boilermakers were to make a heroic final, last-breath drive and capped their stellar effort with an amazing field goal from Spencer Evans.

Purdue earned its third win this season against an AP Top 25 ranked opponent. It is the first time since 2003 that Purdue has defeated three ranked teams in a single season. Markell Jones rushed for his 18th career touchdown, passing Otis Armstrong (17, 1970–72) for 10th on Purdue's all-time career rushing touchdowns list. Terry Wright totaled six receptions for a career-high 146 yards and three touchdowns. Wright entered the game with 474 career receiving yards and two previous touchdowns.

at Minnesota

 Sources:

After facing in-division rival Iowa, Purdue traveled to the Minnesota Golden Gophers.

Minnesota won in a blowout, 41–10. Minnesota opened the scoring in the first quarter via a 24-yard field goal by Emmit Carpenter. Purdue responded with a 40-yard Spencer Evans field goal to end the first quarter. Minnesota extended their lead in the second quarter via an 11-yard touchdown pass from Seth Green to Jake Paulson and a 27-yard Carpenter field goal, which made the score 13–3 in favor of Minnesota at half-time. Minnesota added 21 points in the third quarter via a 46-yard fumble recovery for a touchdown by Blake Cashman, a two-yard touchdown run by Green and an 11-yard Bryce Williams touchdown run. Minnesota added 7 more points in the fourth quarter via a 12-yard touchdown pass by Tanner Morgan to Tyler Johnson. Purdue finally got another score late in the fourth quarter via a nine-yard touchdown pass to Rondale Moore from David Blough.

Purdue was held to its lowest score and fewest total points since a 17–9 loss to Wisconsin in 2017. The 31-point margin of defeat was the largest Purdue had suffered since losing to Penn State by 38 points in 2016. Purdue entered the game with a 43 percent third-down conversion rate, but was 0-for-12 on third down against the Gophers.

Wisconsin

 Sources:

After facing Minnesota, Purdue returned home to face the Wisconsin Badgers on Senior Day.

Wisconsin defeated Purdue 47–44 in triple overtime. After a scoreless first quarter by both teams, Purdue scored ten points in the second quarter, via an 18-yard touchdown pass to D. J. Knox from David Blough and a 20-yard field goal by Spencer Evans. Wisconsin scored on a 29-yard Rafael Gaglianone field goal bring the score to 10–3 in favor of Purdue at half-time. Wisconsin opened the second half scoring when Jonathan Taylor via an 80-yard touchdown run and a 22-yard field goal by Gaglianone. Purdue responded with two third quarter touchdowns via a 12-yard touchdown run by Markell Jones and a 46-yard touchdown pass to Rondale Moore from Blough. Purdue scored first in the fourth quarter on a 20-yard Evans field goal, but two late touchdown receptions by Danny Davis III from Jack Coan of five and 18-yards respectively tied the game before regulation ended.

In the first overtime, Purdue scored on its first possession with a 15-yard touchdown reception by Moore from Blough. Wisconsin responded with a 12-yard touchdown run by Taylor. Wisconsin opened the second overtime with a 4-yard Garrett Groshek touchdown run, but Purdue responded on the next play with a 25-yard Issac Zico touchdown pass from Blough. When Purdue scored on a 41-yard Evans field goal to open the third overtime, Wisconsin scored on a 17-yard Taylor touchdown run to seal the victory for Wisconsin.

at Indiana

 Sources:

Following its home finale against Wisconsin, Purdue traveled to Bloomington, Indiana to face its arch-rival, the Indiana Hoosiers, in the 94th playing of Old Oaken Bucket.

Purdue defeated Indiana 28–21. Purdue scored 7 points in the first quarter via an 11-yard touchdown pass from David Blough to Issac Zico. Indiana responded with 7 points in the second quarter via an eight-yard touchdown run by Stevie Scott. Purdue regained its lead in the second quarter via a 56-yard touchdown pass from Blough to Rondale Moore, which made the score 14–7 in favor of Purdue at half-time. Purdue added a 33-yard touchdown reception by Moore from Blough in the third quarter. Indiana reduced Purdue's lead to seven points following a 23-yard touchdown run from Peyton Ramsey in the fourth quarter. Purdue responded with a 32-yard touchdown run by Markell Jones. Indiana scored again with 1:17 to play on a 40-yard touchdown reception by Nick Westbrook-Ikhine from Ramsey.

Purdue finished in 3rd place of the Big Ten West Division with a 5–4 record in conference play. The win also made Purdue bowl eligible for the second consecutive year.

vs Auburn (Music City Bowl)

 Sources:

Awards and honors

References

Purdue
Purdue Boilermakers football seasons
Purdue Boilermakers football